The 124th Illinois Volunteer Infantry Regiment, also known as the Excelsior Regiment, was an infantry regiment that served in the Union Army during the American Civil War.

Background
On August 7, 1862, in response to President Abraham Lincoln's call for troops to fight in the American Civil War, a muster roll was begun in the office of Judge John H. Howe in Kewanee, in Henry County, Illinois.  Company A and Company F were from the village of Kewanee.

Company B was recruited in Batavia and Lodi, in Kane county.

Company C, known as the Springfield Company, was raised in Springfield, Illinois and in Jersey county.

Company D was raised from Colchester and Tennessee townships in the Illinois county of McDonough.  It was consolidated with a band of Good Templars from Chicago and Dundee, Illinois.

Campaigns
After being mustered into federal service, the regiment moved south to begin its service in the Western Theatre.  Upon reaching the front at Jackson, Tennessee, it became part of Grant's operations which culminated in the Siege of Vicksburg.

Following duties in the Vicksburg area, the regiment was sent via New Orleans to participate in action against the defenses of Mobile after the Battle of Mobile Bay.

See also
List of Illinois Civil War Units
Illinois in the American Civil War

References
(From pages 1 – 5 of "History of the 124th Regiment Illinois Infantry Volunteers, Otherwise Known as the "Hundred and Two Dozen," from August 1862 to August 1865," by R L Howard, Chaplain. Springfield, Illinois; printed and bound by H W Rokker. 1880.)

Units and formations of the Union Army from Illinois
Military units and formations established in 1862
Military units and formations disestablished in 1865
1862 establishments in Illinois